VIA University College is a university college organisation in Central Denmark Region, Denmark, established in January 2008. It is present in the region with a total of eight campuses.

History

The university colleges in Denmark were established as a result of a series of mergers of smaller educational centres in 2007. VIA is one of those university colleges. From January 2008, all medium higher education in the Central Region previously under CVU (Center for Higher Education), became organized as one unit under VIA. As a result of these mergers, VIA became the third largest educational institution following Copenhagen University and Aarhus University with approximately 2,000 employees and 20,000 students.

Nowadays, VIA University College offers vocational bachelor courses of  the following types:
pedagogical, health professional, and technical-commercial. In addition, VIA also offers a two-year high school exam. Overall, VIA offers more than 50 higher educations in Danish and a number of courses in English. VIA also participates in various research and development projects. VIA is headquartered in Aarhus, but the activities are anchored on eight campuses spread across 39 locations throughout the region. VIA's annual turnover is 1.6 billion DKK.

Applicants and enrollment
Most of the educations, VIA University College operates, enroll students twice a year, that is in February and September. The statistics below encompass both enrollments. The number of students VIA University College can enroll is determined by the Ministry of education through among other an average of unemployment statistics. Thus, a local VIA University college institution might have its enrollment reduced if the unemployment rate within its area of operation is higher than the average and vice versa.

Organisation
VIA is organised like most universities. At the very top there is a board of directors, which selects the rector. The rector heads the executive board together with the deans. There is one dean per faculty. The largest faculty measured in terms of students and turnover is the faculty of Education & Social Studies followed by the faculty of Health Sciences and the School of Business, Technology and Creative Industries and finally the faculty of Continuing Education. The faculties are serviced by a series of departments such as marketing, corporate finance, student administration etc. They are organised between the executive board and the faculties.

Campuses 
VIA University College has several campuses across Central Region Denmark and is present in  Aarhus, Grenå, Randers, Skive, Viborg, Holstebro, Nørre Nissum, Ikast, Herning, Silkeborg, Skanderborg, and Horsens.

Campus Aarhus 
VIA University College has its headquarters in Aarhus, where it also operates two newly built campuses. The largest is VIA Campus Aarhus C, which is built in the new residential area called CeresByen in central Aarhus. Campus Aarhus C houses mainly educations from the department of Education and Social studies, but also includes assorted business, media, design and architectural and constructional vocational programmes. The smaller campus, Campus Aarhus N, is located in the northern neighbourhood of Skejby, close to the Aarhus University Hospital, and houses educations from the Department of health such as nursing and nutritional educations.

Campus Horsens 

Campus Horsens holds most of the engineering, technical and business programmes of VIA University College, but soon Danish programmes in nursing and in pedagogy will also be present here to the professional multiplicity. The increasing campus population is now around 4,000 students – of whom approx. half are international students from more than 40 different countries.

The new student housing placed directly on Campus contributes to the pulse here, as does the Student Bar, social activities and group work after classes.

Above Campus Horsens towers the newly built 8,000 m2 Vitus Bering Innovation Park, named after the famous Horsens resident and Arctic explorer Vitus Bering (1681 - 1741). The VBI Park also plays an important role in the interaction between the programmes and the companies that employ the students after graduation. Another facilitator of contact between students and companies is the Career Service Centre, also based on Campus.

A new and improved campus has just been finished and inaugurated. Is not only modern but also convenient, since it is right next to the train station.

Campus Randers 

In Randers VIA University College offers nursing, social education and as one out two university colleges in Denmark, VIA also offers psychomotor therapy. The campus is situated in the middle of Randers in a new three story building, which houses the aforementioned educations as well as COK educations. The latter is not offered by VIA, but by a third party. Furthermore, from 2017 VIA also offers FIF-courses in Randers, which is a preparation course for refugees and immigrants. From 2017 the social education department offers a six-month 30 ECTS course in the Early Childhood-field. In early 2018 it has been decided that a part of the teacher training in Aarhus relocates to Randers from 2018. The teacher training programme is part of the qualification teacher training programme in Aarhus. Approximately 800 students attend the educations housed at campus Randers. In addition to the aforementioned educations, campus Randers also offers counselling in entrepreneurship as part of VIA's growth initiatives and in collaboration with the municipality of Randers as well as Business Academy Dania.

VækstVærket (growth forum)
VækstVærket is located on campus Randers, but has its own facilities as well as budget. VIA and Dania each have a coordinator, which coordinates activities such as courses, teaching etc. Furthermore, VækstVærket also offers students excursions to various startup villages as well as highly successful cultural get-togethers with students from different countries. In  Students from VIA and Dania can use VækstVærket for study purposes as well as work on growth projects. In addition they also have the option of receiving council from a professional consultant. Finally VækstVærket also offers various courses in entrepreneurship and a chance to partake in projects about entrepreneurship.

Campus Viborg 
VIA campus Viborg houses, among other departments, The Animation Workshop, which is considered one of the top animation schools in the world. TAW offers BA educations in Character Animation, Computer Graphic Arts and, since 2013, Graphic Storytelling. Apart from its education activities, TAW hosts the Viborg Animation Festival, the largest animation festival in Denmark.

Degree Programmes
The table below lists the various programmes, VIA offers in English.

VIA Summer School
Every year, VIA offers a variety of summer schools at Campus Horsens. The courses are taught in English.

Partners universities and programmes
VIA University College is engaged in various international research and development projects as the leading institution or as a partner. Projects are initiated under a variety of funding programmes and are often interdisciplinary and cross-sectorial yet always rooted within the educational fields of VIA's Faculties and Schools.

Partners universities:
  California State University East Bay;
  Edinburgh Napier University;
  Universidad Politécnica de Valencia.

Some of the programmes VIA is participating in:

 Erasmus (Life Long Learning Programme)/Erasmus+;
 Erasmus Mundus;
 Leonardo da Vinci;
 EU – Australia;
 DK – USA/Canada;
 Tempus.

See also 
There are several other university college organisations in Denmark:

 University College of Northern Denmark (UCN);
 University College Lillebaelt;
 West Jutland University College;
 University College South Denmark;
 University College Sealand;
 University College Capital;
 Metropolitan University College.

References

External links 

VIA University College, Danish website
VIA University College, English website

Central Denmark Region
Higher education in Aarhus
Universities in Denmark
Colleges in Denmark